Alfred J. Reid was a college football player and chemist. A native of Lake Charles, he was a prominent fullback for the LSU Tigers. He was selected All-Southern in 1913. He was captain of the 1915 team.

References

LSU Tigers football players
Players of American football from Louisiana
All-Southern college football players
American football fullbacks
Year of birth missing
Year of death missing
American chemists